"I'm Gonna Be Alright" is a song by American singer Jennifer Lopez from her second studio album, J.Lo (2001). It was written by Lopez, Lorraine Cheryl Cook, Ronald LaPread and producers Cory Rooney and Troy Oliver. "I'm Gonna Be Alright" was remixed by Poke & Tone of Trackmasters for Lopez's first remix album, J to tha L-O! The Remixes (2002). It was released on April 1, 2002, by Epic Records as the album's second single. The remix features rapper Nas and achieved moderate success on the music charts worldwide, and peaked at number 10 on the Billboard Hot 100, becoming Lopez's sixth U.S. top ten single.

The original Track Masters Remix features 50 Cent. At the time of the single release, Epic Records chose Nas for the radio version. Nas re-recorded new rap verses and the track was cut down to 2:52, becoming the Track Masters Remix Radio Edit. Nas replacing 50 Cent caused controversy; and the rappers, who were previously like "brothers" have resented each other since. The remix's beat contains re-adaptions of the instrumental used on Luniz's 1995 song "I Got 5 on It" featuring Michael Marshall, a song which itself sampled Club Nouveau's 1987 song "Why You Treat Me So Bad".

Music and production 

"I'm Gonna Be Alright" has a length of three minutes and forty-four seconds (3:44). It was written by Lopez, Lorraine Cheryl Cook, Ronald LaPread and the song's producers, Cory Rooney and Troy Oliver. She recorded her vocals for the song at Sony Music Studios in New York City with Robert Williams. The song was later mixed by Tony Maserati and mastered by Ted Jensen at Sterling Sound studios. According to J.Lo'''s liner notes, the song contains a re-play of elements from the track "8th Wonder" (1980) originally recorded by American hip-hop trio The Sugarhill Gang. Jean-Claude Olivier and Samuel Barnes served as additional writers for the Trackmasters remix single version, with Track Masters serving as producers along with Rooney. It features rapper, Nas. Of working with Nas, Lopez stated: "I love Nas [sic] I've been a fan of his since his first album. I could [recite] all the words by heart. It was just a dream to be able to work with him. He said he would do it and he did it just like that. [Nas and I] shot the video here in Spanish Harlem a few days ago." The remix's beat contains re-adaptions of the instrumental used on Luniz's 1995 song "I Got 5 on It" featuring Michael Marshall, a song which itself sampled Club Nouveau's 1987 song "Why You Treat Me So Bad".

 Controversy 

Controversy ensued over the radio and album versions. Epic Records decided to place Nas on the radio version due to his popularity at the time instead of 50 Cent. 50 Cent became angry at "former" friend Nas. Nas threatened him, stating: "So he's like a kid living in a hip-hop fantasy world. J.Lo is a friend of mine, if she wants to do a record, I'm doing a record with her [sic] 50 was like a little brother to me." In response to 50 Cent's constant slamming of the collaboration, Nas stated: "To sum it all up, 50 is still a new artist. I would say he's got a good five to six more albums before I can really respond to him. With my other battles, it was different. This is not really my thing right here." 50 Cent held no hard feelings towards Lopez, but towards Nas only. According to Epic Records, the switch in artists made on the radio version was "purely business." The 50 Cent-featured version appears on the first American pressings of the J to tha L-O!: The Remixes album (the European version and later US pressings feature a no-rap version) while the Nas-featured version appears on the European pressing of Lopez's 2002 album, This Is Me... Then. The iTunes & Apple Music version only contains a no-rap version, despite the artists title. Of the original song from J.Lo, Tom Sinclair of Entertainment Weekly called the song "upbeat" but noted that: "I'm Gonna Be Alright for instance — which is based on the Sugarhill Gang's 8th Wonder — is attributed to Lopez and eight other writers (presumably making Jen the ninth wonder.)"

 Commercial performance 
On the week ending April 27, 2002, "I'm Gonna Be Alright" debuted at number 69 on the Billboard Hot 100. The following week, it jumped to 52, and to 36 the next week. On the week ending May 18, it moved three places to 33 on the Hot 100 and the Billboard Hot 100 Airplay chart. On the week ending June 1, it broke the top twenty, shifting 26-18 on the Hot 100 and moving to 20 on the Airplay chart. Two weeks later, it moved 14-11. The following week, "I'm Gonna Be Alright" peaked at number 10 on the Hot 100, becoming Lopez's sixth top-ten hit, and Nas' fourth top-ten. It remained at number 10 for five consecutive weeks. It peaked at 29 on the Canadian Hot 100 and six on the Billboard Pop Songs chart.

The song also achieved considerable success elsewhere. In Australia, "I'm Gonna Be Alright" debuted and peaked at sixteen on July 21, 2002. It was certified Gold by the Australian Recording Industry Association for sales exceeding 35,000 copies. It debuted at number three on the UK Singles Chart, selling nearly 45,000 copies in its first week on the chart. The song peaked at number nine in Belgian Flanders and six in Germany. In Norway, the song debuted at fifteen and peaked at ten. In New Zealand, "I'm Gonna Be Alright" debuted at 46 on the charted date of July 28, 2002, and peaked at 30 for two weeks. In France, the song debuted at 91 on September 14, 2002, and peaked at twelve, having charted for a total of sixteen weeks. Additionally, it entered the top ten in Denmark, Hungary, Netherlands, and Switzerland.

 Music video 

Lopez said that the music video of "I'm Gonna Be Alright" was reminiscent of her thriller film, Enough (2002). During the video, she had to leave a relationship with a "baddy". Lopez explained: "The song relates to the movie that's coming out at the same time [sic] It's about being in a relationship that you know is not good for you but you know you're gonna be OK [once you end it]. [The video] is basically about a day in the life of this girl who has this going on in her head. I also wanted the set in a neighborhood that was real and capture the essence of how I grew up. I grew up in the Bronx — it had the same kind of urban, city flavor. [The video captures] all the essences — guys playing dominoes, girls sunning on the side of the street because they don't wanna take the bus to the beach." The music video was shot on April 16 and 17, 2002. The music video for "I'm Gonna Be Alright" was directed by Dave Meyers and filmed in the Bronx, New York City, featuring Nas.

The video begins with the atmosphere of a hot day in Spanish Harlem. Lopez and Nas appear singing in front of a barbed wire fence. Lopez sings in the neighborhood about letting go of a relationship that is not good for her, as the local male residents look on and stare. She appears at a barber shop with her then-husband, Cris Judd, and later at a coin laundry and record shop. She is also playing baseball with men on the street. She later dumps one of her lovers on the street. The clip ends with Lopez winning the baseball game. In 2011, a writer from Daily Express likened the sex appeal from her music video for "On the Floor" to that of "I'm Gonna Be Alright", writing: "[Lopez] once told us in song that I’m Gonna Be Alright and now she’s proved it. The curves she displayed when she recorded the hit video nine years ago have been replaced by a leaner, fitter look."

 Track listings 

 Credits and personnel 
Credits adapted from the liner notes of J.Lo''.
 Jennifer Lopez – vocalist, songwriter
 Troy Oliver – songwriter, producer, drum and keyboard programming
 Cory Rooney – songwriter, producer, drum and keyboard programming
 Jose Sanchez – drum and keyboard programming
 Robert Williams – vocal producer, vocal recording engineer
 David Swope – assistant recording engineer
 Tony Maserati – mixing
 Peter Wade Keusch – assistant mixer
 Ted Jensen – mixing
 Shelene Thomas – backing vocals

Charts

Weekly charts

Year-end charts

Certifications

Release history

References

External links 
 

2001 songs
2002 singles
Jennifer Lopez songs
Music videos directed by Dave Meyers (director)
Nas songs
Remix singles
Songs written by Cory Rooney
Songs written by Jean-Claude Olivier
Songs written by Jennifer Lopez
Songs written by Samuel Barnes (songwriter)
Songs written by Sylvia Robinson
Songs written by Troy Oliver